Rebecca Banner (née Drake) is a fictional character, a supporting character appearing in American comic books published by Marvel Comics. She is the mother of Bruce Banner, who would grow up to be the gamma-powered superhero known as the Hulk.

Publication history
Created by Bill Mantlo and Sal Buscema, the character made her first appearance in Incredible Hulk vol. 2 #267 (Jan. 1982).

Fictional character biography
Rebecca Banner was the mother of Bruce Banner who eventually grew up to become the superhero known as The Hulk. During college Rebecca met, fell in love and eventually married Brian Banner and was anxious to start a family with him but he didn't feel the same way as she did given his own troubled past. Brian never shared his personal history with her or of his desire to never have any children, but he couldn't help but fall in love with Rebecca and marry her. After college and getting married, Brian became the youngest person to graduate with a Ph.D. and a degree in physics, his post-graduate options were unlimited but he settled on going to Los Alamos to work on a government project to find a source for clean nuclear radiation so that he could support both him and Rebecca. The stress of the job led Brian to start drinking which also led him to become more erratic and quick to anger with Rebecca and his fellow employees. Despite his behavior Rebecca stayed with Brian hoping things would turn around.

After one night of excessive drinking, Brian tried to work on his project and accidentally caused an overload of the equipment. Brian was court-martialed and released from the project; even though he was behind a shield when the overload occurred and multiple doctors examined him and found nothing, Brian still felt that some amount of radiation got through and affected his genetic structure and was even more convinced not to have any children. Brian eventually found another job and started to try and pull his life together when Rebecca announced that she was pregnant, even though Rebecca was happy to have child and finally start a family, Brian was shocked and afraid. Rebecca had some problems during the pregnancy and giving birth to their son 'Bruce'; although the complications were not known to the Doctors, Brian feared and suspected it was because of the Gamma-Radiation from his lab accident and started to become afraid of Bruce. After Bruce's birth in Dayton, Ohio, he was kept in extensive care for observation and examination at the hospital, but the doctors still found nothing out of the ordinary with him. He was also examined for any trace radiation due to Brian's exposure but none was detected. Even so, Brian still thought that something was wrong with Bruce, and would try to spend as little time as possible with him, worrying Rebecca in the process. When Brian and Rebecca would go away, they would leave Bruce with a nanny who showed no affection or attention towards Bruce, making him feel isolated.

One Christmas morning, when Bruce was approximately four years old, he woke up early and snuck down to the Christmas tree, opened one of his presents (which was an erector set), and managed to put together an intricate structure in a short time. When Brian came down and saw it, he grew angry and smashed the structure. He started yelling at Bruce and calling him a freak, while saying that a child his age should not be able to do that. Brian had become more convinced that the radiation from his accident had altered Bruce's brain, making him a super-smart metahuman. When Rebecca heard the commotion and saw what was happening, she tried to calm Brian down and protect Bruce, but it did not stop Brian from hitting her. Bruce became frightened and tried to run to his mother but Brian hit him too. Brian looked at Bruce and called him an inhuman monster, and he also admitted he never wanted a child in the first place. From then on, Rebecca and Bruce would be terrorized and abused by Brian whenever he had a temper-tantrum.

A few years later, after having suffered from physical and mental abuse, Rebecca tried to escape from Brian permanently. As she was outside with Bruce about to drive away, Brian caught them at the car before they could leave and started to struggle with Rebecca again. Bruce yelled to his father to let his mother go and that he will be good but Brian threw Rebecca to the ground, smashing her head which killed her by accident. Bruce ran to her side and sat there frozen in shock beside her lifeless body. It was at this point where Bruce shut down his emotions and become a repressed personality. Brian was placed under arrest and sent to a mental hospital, while Bruce was sent to live with his mother's sister, Susan Drake. When he grew older, Bruce attended Science High School. Due to his extremely high intelligence level and the fact that he had for all practical purposes turned off his emotions years ago, he had no friends at the school and was subjected to harassment. The headmaster showed concern for Bruce and his unresolved anger and feelings about his father and his mother's murder.

During the Chaos War storyline, Rebecca Banner (alongside Brian Banner) is among the characters that returned from the dead after what happened to the death realms. Brian in a form similar to Devil Hulk tried to kill her again only for the Hulk/Bruce to save her and fight his father head-on.

Other versions

Hulk: The End
In an alternate future where Rebecca, along with the rest of humanity, except for the Hulk, had long since died more than 100 years ago after a nuclear war spread across the planet. Bruce Banner at the age of 200, thanks to the power of the Hulk, was dying from a heart attack. Before he succumbed to his death, he saw a vision of a paradise where all his loved ones, including his mother, Rebecca, were waiting for him with open arms.

House of M
In the House of M timeline created by the Scarlet Witch, Dr. Brian Banner believed that his son Bruce would become a metahuman monster created through the radiation that he experimented with, and attempted to kill him in fear and paranoia. He murdered his wife, Rebecca, when she tried to stop him from killing their son. Before he could harm Bruce too, Brian was shot to death by policemen who had been alerted and had arrived at the scene.

In other media
Rebecca Banner appears in Hulk, portrayed by Cara Buono. In the film, she is renamed "Edith" where she and David Banner raised their son Bruce until she was killed by David who caused the gamma explosion.

References

External links
 Rebecca Banner on Marvel Comics Database
 Comic Vine

Characters created by Bill Mantlo
Characters created by Sal Buscema
Comics characters introduced in 1982
Fictional characters from Ohio
Marvel Comics film characters
Marvel Comics female characters